Stealing a Nation is a 2004 Granada Television documentary about the British–American clandestine operation that saw the expulsion of the Chagossian population who have lived on Diego Garcia and neighbouring islands since the late 18th century. More than 2,000 people were exiled to Mauritius between 1967 and 1973, so that Diego Garcia could become a United States military airbase (see depopulation of Chagossians from the Chagos Archipelago). The film contains a series of interviews with Chagossians, who have been deprived of their right of return and forced to live in abject poverty. Stealing a Nation was written and directed by Australian journalist John Pilger, and produced and directed by Christopher Martin; reconstruction footage was directed by Sean Crotty.

Reception, awards and festival screenings 
Stealing a Nation was awarded the 2004 Royal Television Society Award in the category "Single Documentary - General".

The film was screened at the United Nations Association Film Festival in October 2005.

It was given the Chris Award in the Social Issues category at the Columbus International Film & Video Festival in November 2005.

References

External links
 
 Stealing a Nation at Top Documentary Films
 
 

2004 television films
2004 films
2003 television specials
British television documentaries
Chagos Archipelago
Chagos Archipelago sovereignty dispute
Documentary films about indigenous rights
Documentary films presented by John Pilger
2000s English-language films
2000s British films